Al-Salihiyah is a municipality and neighborhood of Damascus, Syria. The quarter is famous as a resting place of venerated Islamic scholars, such as the mystic Sufi scholar and philosopher Ibn Arabi and the Hanabila Mosque. Further to the south, it also houses the Syrian Parliament building.

Neighborhoods
Abu Jarash (pop. 12,798)
Al-Madaris (pop. 12,731)
Al-Mazra'a (pop. 6,818)
Qasyoun (pop. 22,017)
Shaykh Muhyi ad-Din (pop. 11,502)
Ash-Shuhada (pop. 6,437)

References

Neighborhoods of Damascus